John McGlynn may refer to:

John McGlynn (actor) (born 1953), Scottish actor
John McGlynn (Scottish footballer) (born 1961), football (soccer) player and manager (Raith Rovers FC, Heart of Midlothian FC, Livingston FC)
John McGlynn (Gaelic footballer), Kerry player
John H. McGlynn (born 1952), American editor/translator
John J. McGlynn (1922–2016), American politician in Massachusetts
 John McGlynn, musician and member of Anúna